Siddharth Nigam is an Indian actor who works in Indian television and films. He is known for his role as young Sahir and Samar in Dhoom 3, young Mauryan prince Ashoka in Colors TV's Chakravartin Ashoka Samrat, Prince Bindusara in StarPlus's Chandra Nandini and Aladdin in Sony SAB's Aladdin – Naam Toh Suna Hoga.

Personal life 

Nigam was brought up in Allahabad, Uttar Pradesh. He has an elder brother, Abhishek Nigam, who is also an actor and their mother runs an NGO and a beauty parlour.

He completed his tenth class studies at Khelgaon Public School, where he practiced for gymnastics. Nigam has won a gold medal in parallel bar and a silver medal in high bar at 58th National School Games, Pune. Later he moved to Mumbai from Allahabad. In 2021, Nigam pursued a degree from Thakur College in Kandivali, Mumbai.

Nigam also owns two houses in Mumbai.

Career
Nigam started his acting career in 2011 by appearing in a Bournvita advertisement. After watching him in advertisement, makers of the film Dhoom 3 called him for an audition to play the Young Sahir/Samar. The film was directed by Vijay Krishna Acharya, and it was released on 20 December 2013. Taran Adarsh of the entertainment portal Bollywood Hungama reviewed, "Siddharth Nigam is a talent to watch out for, he's superb!". Writing for India Today Suhani Singh said, "He lights up the screen with his self-assured performance and charming presence".

After his successful debut in film, he debuted on television with the role of Young Rudra in the mythological drama series Maha Kumbh: Ek Rahasaya, Ek Kahani. The show aired on 15 December 2014 on Life Ok television.

In February 2015, Nigam was seen in the historical drama series Chakravartin Ashoka Samrat where he played the lead role of Young Ashoka.

On 15 February 2015, Nigam appeared as a guest in a special Mahashivratri episode on Comedy Nights with Kapil. In 2016, he was seen in Jhalak Dikhhla Jaa 9 as a contestant and later as Young Shivaji in Peshwa Bajirao. In 2017, he portrayed the character of Bindusara, the son of Emperor Chandragupta Maurya in Chandra Nandini, along with his brother Abhishek, who played Bhadraketu.

From 2018 to 2021, he played Aladdin in Sony SAB's Aladdin—Naam Toh Suna Hoga. He was last seen as Shivaay in Sony SAB's Hero – Gayab Mode On. Nigam will next star in a film named The Shoonyah: Chapter 1 - Blow of The War Horns.

In March 2022, Nigam made his debut as a singer and lyricist with Tum Mili.

In August 2022, Nigam was selected as one of the "Cultural Ambassador of India" along with 74 others at the 75th Anniversary of Indian Independence.

On 31 August 2022, Nigam turned entrepreneur by launching his own activewear brand Ulltor.

In April 2023, Nigam will be seen in Kisi Ka Bhai Kisi Ki Jaan.

Filmography

Films

Television

Special appearances

Music videos

Awards and nominations

See also 
 List of Indian television actors
List of Indian male film actors

References

External links

Living people
Indian Hindus
Male actors from Allahabad
Actors from Mumbai
21st-century Indian male child actors
21st-century Indian male actors
Male actors in Hindi cinema
Indian male film actors
Indian male television actors
Indian male dancers
Participants in Indian reality television series
Reality dancing competition contestants
Year of birth missing (living people)